Solaris De La Luna Barba Cañizales (born March 1, 1999) is a Panamanian model, dancer and beauty pageant titleholder who was crowned Miss Universe Panamá 2022 and represented Panama at Miss Universe 2022.

She was previously crowned as Miss World Panamá 2018 and represented Panama at the Miss World 2018 in Sanya, China, where she finished in the Top 12 and was awarded the title Miss World Americas 2018.

Early life and education
Barba is from Arraiján.  She graduated in 2016 from Instituto Justo Arosemena with a specialization in business, and is studying marketing and international business.

Pageantry

Señorita Panamá 2018 
On June 7, 2018, Barba represented Herrera at the Señorita Panamá 2018 pageant held at the Roberto Duran Arena in Panama City, and won the title of Miss World Panama 2018 by the outgoing Julianne Brittón.

Miss World 2018 
In December 2018. she represented Panama at the Miss World 2018 competition in China in December, where she was one of the top 12 semifinalists and was awarded the title Miss World Americas 2018, the highest placement achieved by a Panamanian up to that date.

Miss Universe Panamá 2022 
On May 25, 2022, Barba was crowned Miss Universe Panamá 2022 pageant by succeeded outgoing Señorita Panamá - Universe 2021, Brenda Smith of Panamá Centro.

Miss Universe 2022 
She represented Panama at the Miss Universe 2022 pageant, held at the New Orleans Morial Convention Center in New Orleans, Louisiana in the United States on January 14, 2023. During the national costume competition, she wore a colorful outfit entitled "Bridge of the World, Heart of the Universe", covered in beads and rhinestones, paired with a huge feathered headpiece and metallic gloves. The costume also included a giant gold heart attached to her back, which represented "her love for people who visit her home country" but was constantly slipping to the side during her performance. Ultimately, she did not make placement to the Top 16.

References

External links

1999 births
Living people
Panamanian female models
Panamanian beauty pageant winners
Miss World 2018 delegates
Miss Universe 2022 contestants